SS Waroonga was a steel-hulled passenger and cargo steamship that was launched in Scotland in 1882, renamed Bansei Maru in 1913 and scrapped in Japan in 1926. Her career included periods in British, Australian and Japanese ownership.

Building

Waroonga was screw-propelled, with an inverted two-cylinder compound steam engine also built by A & J Inglis. The engine had a  stroke, its high-pressure cylinder had a  bore and its low-pressure cylinder had a  bore. It was rated at 317 NHP.

Dawes registered Waroonga in Glasgow. Her UK official number was 86749 and her code letters were HGQW.

Maiden voyage
Waroongas maiden voyage started from London on 26 March 1883. She sailed to Brisbane via Suez and Batavia. On her maiden voyage she carried Harry "Breaker" Morant to Australia.

Changes of ownership and registry
In 1885 British India Associated Steamers became Waroongas owners. In 1889 the Australasian United Steam Navigation Company bought her and registered her in Brisbane. In 1900 the British India Steam Navigation Company bought her back and registered her in Glasgow.

In 1913 bought Waroonga, renamed her Bansei Maru and registered her in Kobe. She then passed through a series of Japanese owners who registered her in various ports in Japan and Kwantung. She was scrapped in 1926.

References

1882 ships
Coastal passenger vessels of Australia
Passenger ships of the United Kingdom
Ships of the British India Steam Navigation Company
Ships built on the River Clyde
Steamships of Australia
Steamships of Japan
Steamships of the United Kingdom